Renatus Heinrich Deltgen born 30 April 1909 in Esch-sur-Alzette, Luxembourg; died 29 January 1979 in Cologne, West Germany) was a Luxembourgian stage and film actor, who spent most of his career in Germany.

Biography 
Deltgen was the son of the chemist Mathias Deltgen and his wife Katharina, née Pütz. After graduating from high school, he went to Cologne in 1927 to attend the drama school there. From 1931 to 1934 he gained stage experience at the Städtische Bühnen Köln. He had his first successes in the play Der Graue by Friedrich Forster. After a one-year engagement at the Städtische Bühnen Frankfurt, he got his first film role at UFA in 1935 in Das Mädchen Johanna, a film about Joan of Arc. 

Until 1944 he played on various stages in Berlin and appeared in numerous films. His parade roles were those of the charming lover or the unscrupulous adventurer. German cultural policy in Luxembourg, which was annexed by Germany, attempted to represent Deltgen during the Second World War as a type of Luxembourgian who had established himself in the Reich;  in 1939 he was appointed a state actor. In 1944, Deltgen was on the Gottbegnadeten list of the Reich Ministry for Popular Enlightenment and Propaganda. Posters on which he promoted the entry of Luxembourg youth into the Hitler Youth offended the population's former pride in Luxembourg's best-known actor. Even in the post-war years, his compatriots did not forgive him for collaborating with the Germans. In 1945/46, therefore, there was a much-publicized trial against Deltgen in Luxembourg for treason. The sentence was two years in prison, a fine of 100,000 francs and the loss of his Luxembourg nationality, which was, however, restored to him in 1952. He had to serve only part of the prison sentence.

Selected filmography

References

External links 
 

1909 births
1979 deaths
People from Esch-sur-Alzette
Luxembourgian male television actors
Luxembourgian male film actors
20th-century Luxembourgian male actors
German Film Award winners